Michael Troy Brohawn (born January 14, 1973) is a former Major League Baseball pitcher who played for the Arizona Diamondbacks, San Francisco Giants, and Los Angeles Dodgers between 2001 and 2003.

Amateur career
A native of Cambridge, Maryland, Brohawn graduated from Cambridge-South Dorchester High School in 1991, and spent three years at the University of Nebraska, where he played college baseball for the Cornhuskers. He was named First Team All-American in 1993, posting a 13–0 record with nine complete games, and setting a school record with 123 strikeouts in 111.1 innings. In addition to his sterling moundwork, Brohawn batted .329 with three homers and 34 RBIs playing first base. After the 1993 season, he played collegiate summer baseball with the Wareham Gatemen of the Cape Cod Baseball League and was named a league all-star. He was selected by the San Francisco Giants in the 4th round of the 1994 MLB Draft.

Professional career
Brohawn spent 1994 and 1995 with the Class A San Jose Giants, and by 1998 he had progressed to the Giants' Triple A affiliate Fresno Grizzlies. The Giants traded Brohawn to the Arizona Diamondbacks after the 1998 season.

Brohawn made his major league debut with Arizona in 2001, and earned a World Series ring with the 2001 Diamondbacks. In the regular season, he tossed 49.1 innings in 59 appearances with a 4.93 ERA. On April 29, 2001, Brohawn picked up his only save at the MLB level. He pitched 2/3rd of an inning to close out a 7-5 Diamondbacks victory over the Braves. He made one postseason appearance, retiring the New York Yankees in the ninth inning of Game 6 of the 2001 World Series, a 15-2 Diamondbacks romp that knotted the series at three games apiece. In Brohawn's one inning of work, he allowed one hit and no runs in relief of Baseball Hall of Famer Randy Johnson, and struck out Clay Bellinger for the game's final out.
 
After the 2001 season, Brohawn signed as a free agent with San Francisco, and appeared in 11 games for the Giants in 2002. He signed with the Dodgers prior to the 2003 season, and appeared in 12 games, posting a 3.86 ERA in 2003, his final big league season. Arm problems plagued his career, forcing his retirement in 2004.

Coaching career
He was the head coach for the Cambridge-South Dorchester High baseball team, his alma mater. From 2009 to 2011 he worked as a gym and health teacher.

In July 2014 he was named head baseball coach at Salisbury University, an NCAA Division III school in Salisbury, Maryland. In his first season as head coach (2015), he led Salisbury to the Division III College World Series. In 2021, he again led Salisbury to the College World Series, in which the Seagulls won the first National Championship in team history.

Honors
In 2008, Brohawn was inducted into the  Eastern Shore League Baseball Hall of Fame.

Personal
In 2010, he married Stephanie Abt and together they raised three children.

See also
1993 College Baseball All-America Team

References

Sources

Living people
1973 births
Major League Baseball pitchers
Baseball players from Maryland
Arizona Diamondbacks players
San Francisco Giants players
Los Angeles Dodgers players
Nebraska Cornhuskers baseball players
Wareham Gatemen players
People from Cambridge, Maryland
San Jose Giants players
Shreveport Captains players
Fresno Grizzlies players
Tucson Sidewinders players
Arizona League Diamondbacks players
Las Vegas 51s players